Shipwright's Cottage is a historic house built c. 1875 and located at 900 Innes Avenue in India Basin, San Francisco, California. The building is part of a new city park, scheduled for completion in 2025. It is thought that the property has one of the only natural Bay shoreline remaining in San Francisco.

Shipwright's Cottage has been listed as a San Francisco Designated Landmark since May 9, 2008.

History 
The house was originally occupied by shipwrights (or ship builders) that built scow schooners, from approximately 1875 until 1926. It was constructed by carpenter Jan Dirks, for Johnson J. Dircks who was born in the Netherlands. The structure was made with fir wood, and in Italianate and Carpenter Gothic architecture styles. It originally had a windmill on the 2.4 acre property, with a private waterfront view. 

From 1926 until 1961, the building served as the Anderson & Cristofani boatyard office. In the 1990s, the boatyard was shut down by the United States Environmental Protection Agency for illegal dredging; and the house eventually was sold to neglectful owners and fell into disrepair. 

Famous boats built and repaired here included the Alma (1891) boat of the San Francisco Maritime National Historical Park, World War II-era Victory Launch boats, and possibly Jack London's boat the Snark.

Modern-day 
In 2008, the land at 900 Innes Street was donated by Joe Cassidy, a local developer, to the Tenderloin Housing Clinic for the purpose of building neighborhood housing. In September 2010, the abandoned house had a roof fire; which added city agencies to pressure the Tenderloin Housing Clinic to renovate the building.

In 2014, the city of San Francisco purchased the house and the land. The Shipwright's Cottage was featured in the Joe Talbot film, The Last Black Man in San Francisco (2019). 

In 2019, a US$25 million dollar grant from the John Pritzker Family Fund was awarded to help create an 8 acre-park, encompassing the property. Construction for the city park will take place from 2020 until 2025, and it will surround the former boatyard, and include the newly-restored Shipwright's Cottage building, which will serve as the park's visitor's center.

See also 
 List of San Francisco Designated Landmarks

References 

San Francisco Designated Landmarks
Shipyards in California
Boatyards
1875 establishments in California
Bayview–Hunters Point, San Francisco